Monte Criollo is a 1935  Argentine musical film directed and written by Arturo S. Mom. It is a tango film and starred Nedda Francy and Francisco Petrone.

Other cast
Carlos Fioriti   
Agustín Magaldi  
Azucena Maizani  
Miguel Mileo   
Olga Mom  
Pedro Noda  
Marcelo Ruggero 
Domingo Sapelli   
Marino Seré 
Juan Siches de Alarcón   
Oscar Villa

External links

1935 films
Argentine musical films
1930s Spanish-language films
Argentine black-and-white films
Tango films
Films directed by Arturo S. Mom
1935 musical films
1930s Argentine films